The Somali National Movement was one of the first and most important organized guerilla groups opposed to the Siad Barre regime in the 1980s to the 1990s, as well as being the main anti-government faction during the Somaliland War of Independence. The organisation was founded in London, England, on April 6, 1981 by Ahmed Ismail Abdi ‘Duksi’, Hassan Isse Jama, Abdisalam Yasin, Hassan Adan Wadadid, a former Somali diplomat, who stated that the group's purpose was to overthrow the Siad Barre regime.

In May 1991, the organisation declared an independent Republic of Somaliland in the region that had constituted British Somaliland before independence and unification with the former colony of Italian Somaliland in 1960 after a bloody war of independence.

Formation

Saudi Arabia

In 1977, a group of Somali expats in Saudi Arabia hailing from the Isaaq clan begun to collect funds for the aim of launching a newspaper covering Somali affairs. The grassroots group has grown into a semi-political party unofficially referred to as Somali Islamic Democratic party (later Somali National movement) Representing intellectuals, businessmen and prominent figures of the ex-pat community in Saudi Arabia.

By the end of 1979, the group had a strong foothold in local Somali communities in Riyadh, Dhahran, Khobar and especially Jeddah where they set meetings for every 3 months discussing the deteriorating situation in the Somali Democratic Republic post Ogaden War.

In 1980, the key leaders in the Saudi group determined that London provided a more favourable political climate for operating an international dissident group, therefore several people relocated to London to work full-time with the movement. The organisation was formally founded in Jeddah in April 1981 by an intellectual elite with the objective of overthrowing Barre's dictatorial regime.

The First Jeddah Congress 
At the first congress in Jeddah, the organisation's name was officially changed to the "Somali National Movement" (SNM). Additionally, there was a call to action for the proposed funding of three full-time staff members. These individuals would go on to quit their jobs in Saudi Arabia to devote their time to the movement.

United Kingdom

The "Saudi group" reached out to the larger Somali population in United Kingdom soon after, and the organisation's formation was announced on 6 April 1981 in Connaught Hall, London. The said communities composed primarily of students, activists, intellectuals and African communities, particularly Somalis in London, Cardiff, Sheffield, Manchester and Liverpool played greater role in raising funds and spreading awareness of the human rights violation under Mohamed Siad Barre regime.

Due to political and logistical obstacles in Saudi Arabia, the Somali Islamic Democratic party decide to move its headquarters to London and along with Somali London Association, Somali Welfare Association, and Somali National Party (as well as members of the Somali Student Union) to converge and launch Somali National Movement in 1981.

This press conference was reportedly attended by over 500 Somalis from across Europe. A four-page press release also criticised the nepotism, corruption and chaos into which Somalia endured under Siad Barre's dictatorship, and outlined the case to overthrow the regime to reestablish a just and democratic system. Additionally, the SNM advocated a mixed economy and a neutral foreign policy, therefore rejecting alignment with the Soviet Union or the United States and calling for the dismantling of all foreign military bases in the region. However, in the late 1980s a pro-Western foreign policy was adopted and the organisation favored United States involvement in a post-Siad Barre Somalia.

The First SNM Conference 
On 18 October 1981, the organisation had its first official conference at the International Student Union of the University of London. There were 14 delegates drawn from England, Saudi Arabia and other Gulf states in addition to the London-based steering committee. During this, conference it issued a press release entitled ‘A Better Alternative’, which stated that any Somali was welcome to join the movement as long as they believed in the SNM's principles.

Afraad 

One of the major units of the WSLF was the Fourth Brigade known as "Afraad" which was composed of Isaaq officers. Afraad's initial objective was to liberate Somalis living in Somali Region of Ethiopia, but its focus later shifted due to increasing abuses against Isaaq civilian population perpetrated by WSLF. Killing, looting and rape of civilians by WSLF was common from 1978 onwards. This abuse was due to the Somali state employing the Ogadeni subsection of WSLF as a subsidiary militia that would be used to maintain control over the northern regions of Somalia. I. M. Lewis contextualises the period in which Afraad was formed as follows: The process of Daarood colonization of the north including seizure of property and economic favouritism at Isaaq expense, greatly intensified under Gani's brutal rule, with the systematic application of the apparatuses of state repression which increased in number and scope after the formation of the Isaaq-based Somali National Movement in April 1981Armed clashes between Afraad and the Ogaden forces of WSLF began shortly after 1979. An Isaaq army officer arrested 14 leading WSLF fighters who have been harassing and abusing the local population at Gobyar.

From February 1982, Isaaq army officers and fighters from the Fourth Brigade started moving into Ethiopia where they formed the nucleus of what would later become the Somali National Movement.

Funding 
The SNM's capability of obtaining funding domestically was critical to its ability to endure as an insurgent organisation due to the lack of external resources. For a variety of geopolitical reasons, the SNM did not rely on Ethiopia or Libya for funding, unlike the Somali Salvation Democratic Front (SSDF) insurgency in neighbouring Puntland. The end of the Cold War coincided with the peak of the SNM insurgency, significantly reducing the likelihood of the organisation obtaining superpower support.

The task of financing the fight against the Barre regime proved a challenge as the SNM lacked a foreign sponsor. Additionally, the Somalian regime imprisoned wealthy Isaaq merchants and traders to prevent them from financially supporting the organisation. Those who were not imprisoned were forced to report to an 'orientation centre' to prove they were still in town and be degraded. These centres were originally used for socialist propaganda teaching, however were then routinely used to track the movement of citizens in Northern Somalia by the intelligence services.

The SNM had to rely on the support of its Isaaq constituency for funds, which were primarily collected on a clan basis but wealthy businessmen also contributed. The SNM's initial funding model worked in a similar fashion to 'diya' payments whereby each Isaaq clan resident in Saudi Arabia and the Gulf would collect a set amount from their communities. This decentralised funding model gave the organisation relative independence. Moreover, enhancing the organisation's accountability to its numerous supporters. Therefore, this financial autonomy provided more freedom to the organisation but is also thought to have strengthened the insurgency movement.

Revenue generation 
The establishment of internal revenue sources was a crucial factor allowed the organisation to succeed and outperform its competitors. Additionally, the organisation succeeded in fostering relationships with commercial intermediaries via the 'Abban' system (an indigenous credit system constructed outside of Barre’s nationalization processes). Therefore, facilitating the taxing of constituents themselves by commandeering one young man and one sheep from each household. As a result, encouraging entrepreneurialism but also containing it.

Therefore, these processes produced a negotiation between rulers and ruled in which the opinions of ordinary Isaaq kin mattered since they provided the resources to continue the fight.

Role of commercial intermediaries 
Dahabshil which would later become one of Somaliland's largest money transfer and telecom firms started out as an SNM financier. As Isaaq financiers based in Dire Dawa (Ethiopia) used SNM radios to transfer money to fighters, this allowed them to also intervene in the organization’s affairs.

Isaaq delegates received approximately $14–25 million in remittances which funded the supply arms of to the rural guerillas who helped overthrow the Barre regime.

Publications 
In the Summer of 1981, the organisation published a magazine called "Somalia Uncensored". This magazine aimed to spread the message of the SNM to expatriate communities across England and elsewhere. It was edited by Hassan Isse Jama who was a former BBC Somali Service broadcaster who was forced to relinquish his role at the BBC due to his SNM related activities. This publication was printed in London and was largely financed by the Saudi-Somali community. Moreover, it was published on a monthly basis between June and December 1981 whereby its final edition announced the formal transfer of the organisation's leadership to SNM members in Ethiopia. The SNM also published the bi-monthly magazine "Liberty".

Role of women in the SNM 
Women often played an "invisible role" in the organisation working predominantly as nurses and medics during the conflict. Additionally, since they were less likely to arouse suspicion compared to men they travelled more freely allowing them to establish clandestine communication channels which also benefited traders.
One well known woman dubbed the "Somaliland Freedom Fighter" is Amina Mahamoud Suldan.

Military operations 

In 1982, the organisation moved its headquarters from London to Dire Dawa, Ethiopia where 3 key military bases were established. From here, it would launch guerrilla raids into the Waqooyi Galbeed and Togdheer regions. A growing number of northern civilian recruits and defectors from the Somali army, drawn almost exclusively from the Isaaq clan, were shaped into a guerrilla force and trained to produce a hard-core of disciplined fighters. Although the Ethiopians were said to have initially only supplied ammunition, Isaaq recruits came with their own arms in addition the equipment seized from the Somalian army. Soon after, the Somalian army established the "Isaaq Exterminator" command which aimed to ethnically cleanse the Isaaq population.

Over the following years, the SNM made numerous clandestine military incursions into northwest Somalia. Although these attacks never posed a direct threat to the regime's control of the area, such activities and the boldness and tenacity of its small force were a constant irritation to the Barre regime.

The first military offensive of the SNM took place near Baligubadle where a small force attacked a fuel tanker supplying the Somalian regime's base in the town. This operation was organised by local commanders without prior planning utilizing a local force of Arap clansmen based in the organisation's Lanqeyrta base. According to Hassan Isse, 1985–86 was the most effective period of guerrilla warfare by the SNM against the Somalian regime whereby its operations extended southwards with support from Dir clansmen which would later call themselves the "Southern SNM".

In the late 1980s, the National Security Service increased its activities against dissidents and SNM sympathizers. In response, the SNM carried out the assassination of the regional National Security Service Chief in 1986 which led to the newly appointed Northern military commander Mohammed Said Hersi Morgan in unleashing a new wave of terror against the Isaaq population as set out by his "Letter of Death".

However, in 1988 the situation rapidly changed when President Barre and Meningstu signed a peace accord where it was agreed that they would both cease hostilities towards one another and stop harbouring each other's dissident. As a result, forcing the SNM to relocate into Northern Somalia, a key event which drastically changed the trajectory of the conflict whereby its activities lead to an all out war that led to its victory.

The Regime's response to SNM activities 

As the SNM grew in strength and number throughout the 1980s, the Barre became increasingly repressive in the North of the country and systematically targeted those from Isaaq communities who were deemed to be supportive of the SNM. The consequence of the crackdown was a dramatic increase in support of the SNM. As a result, a substantial number of men, soldiers, students, traders, and civil servants joined the exodus to SNM bases in Ethiopia. Nevertheless, this defiant show of resistance in the northwest was met with further subjugation from the regime.

A Human Rights Watch testimony before the United States Congress' Africa Subcommittee on 14 July 1988 stated that the actions of the Barre government have "created a level of violence unprecedented in scope and duration in Somalia". The testimony of Aryeh Neier (co-founder of HRW) explains the context in which the SNM was formed:Since 1981, with the formation of the SNM, northern Somalia has seen the worst atrocities. Serious human right violations, including extra-judicial executions of unarmed civilians, detentions without trial, unfair trials, torture, rape, looting and extortion, have been a prominent feature of life in the towns and countryside in the northern region since 1981. In order to deprive the SNM of a civilian base of support in their area of operation, those living in rural areas between Hargeisa and the Ethiopian border have suffered particularly brutal treatment. A scorched earth policy that involved the burning of farms, the killing of livestock, the destruction of water-storage tanks and the deliberate poisoning of wells, has been pursued actively by the military. The principal towns have been subjected to a curfew for several years; arbitrary restrictions on the extension of the curfew have facilitated extortion by soldiers and curfew patrols. Internal travel is controlled through military checkpoints .... The existence of the SNM has provided a pretext for President Barre and his military deputies in the north to wage a war against peaceful citizens and to enable them to consolidate their control of the country by terrorizing anyone who is suspected of not being wholeheartedly pro-government. Years of sustained state violence have created a serious level of political unrest in the region.

Mobilisation of Local Support 

Unlike other organized guerilla groups which were relatively independent from the non-combatant local population, the SNM established an extensive support network bringing together the diverse segments of the Isaaq population both at home and abroad. The mobilisation of solidarity and relationship building with diverse Isaaq clans was key to ensuring the upkeep of SNM combatants.

A system known as "Qaaraan" which aimed to transform social into economic capital was adopted whereby SNM members would seek support from their respective clans. This system was deeply ingrained in pastoral-nomadic ethics but also extended to urban dwellers. Therefore, acting as a form insurance to prevent the risk of minimise the risk of absolute pauperisation and poverty within clan families.

The Mandera Assault 

On January 2, 1983, the SNM launched its first military operation against the Somalian government. Operating from Ethiopian bases, commando units attacked Mandera Prison near Berbera and freed a group of northern dissidents. The assault liberated more than 700 political prisoners according to SNM reports; subsequent independent estimates indicated that approximately about a dozen government opponents escaped. Simultaneously, SNM commando units raided the Cadaadle armoury near Berbera and escaped with an undetermined amount of arms and ammunition. Directed by Colonel Mohamed Hashi Lihle, it was deemed to be the SNM's "most striking initial military success" and thought to of produced a more coherent and better organised opposition force.

Liberation of Hargeisa and Burao 
Between the 27 and 31 May 1988, the SNM launched its main offensive on Somalia's second capital Hargeisa where it captured a large proportion of the city and fully took over Burao. In this pre-emptive strike, approximately 3000-5000 men from the SNM routed the Somalian army from both cities. In Burao, the SNM led to the killing of many Somalian military leaders and the confiscation of valuable military equipment. The Somalian government responded by with a counterattack which led to over 10,000 Somalian soldiers, SNM rebels and civilians being killed.

However, soon after the Somalian army was able to regain control of both cities by the end of July. This was due to unprecedented levels of internal reinforces, the employment of non-Isaaq militias and Ogaden refugees. Moreover, external assistance to the Somalian regime including mercenary pilots from South Africa and Libya in addition to economic and military aid from the UAE and Italy played a large role in recapturing the cities. Approximately, 50,000 people were killed between March 1988 and March 1989 as a result of the Somalian Army's "savage assault" on the Isaaq population.
Although this operation was not viewed as successful, it was seen as the death knell of Barre's regime and consequently a point of no return in Northern Somalia's (present day Somaliland) move towards independence. Furthermore, the Somalian Army's indiscriminate aerial and artillery bombing of both cities led to the SNM becoming overwhelmed with volunteers. Additionally, Barre's response this operation was seen "as an attack on the whole of the Isaaq people" and led to the Isaaq uniting behind the SNM.

Elders across the Isaaq community took on a leading role to advance mass mobilisation efforts to rejuvenate decimated SNM numbers and capitalise on the enhanced support to organisation by Isaaq civilians. After meetings, it was decided that the Elders also known as the "Guurti" would become responsible for organising logistical support and recruiting new SNM combatants. Consequently, sub-clan affiliation became a key aspect of the military wing of the organisation and the "Guurti" became an integral part of the SNM's central committee after 1988. As a result of this increased support from the local population, the SNM was able to defeat the Somalian army in the North-West of the country.

By June 1989, the SNM was actively mounting attacks on major hubs across the North-West, blockading transport routes and interfering with regime supplies to military garrisons. As a result, the Barre regime gradually lost control of the area by December 1989 with exception to major towns which were under active siege by the SNM. On December 5, 1989, the SNM announced that they have taken control of Hargeisa.

Over the subsequent few years, the SNM would exert control of the vast majority of North-Western Somalia and expanded its operations to approximately 50 km East of Erigavo. Although it never gained full control of major cities including Hargeisa, Burao and Berbera but resorted to laying siege on them. By the beginning of 1991, the SNM succeeded in taking control of North-Western Somalia including Hargeisa and other regional capitals.

Democracy 
In October 1981, Ahmed Mohamed Gulaid was elected as chairman of the organisation alongside Ahmed Ismail Abdi ‘Duksi’ as secretary-general. Additionally, an eight-member executive council was elected to oversee political and military activities. Reports state that the SNM was indisputably the most 'democratic' of all the fronts in Somalia, since it had five elected leaders since its creation, all of whom had served a full term in office, to be replaced by an elected successor.

The Central Committee was responsible for the vast majority of decisions and was responsible for organising regular congresses to elect the leadership. Throughout the organisation's period of activity, various clans were incorporated into the SNM. Additionally, leadership roles were awarded across clan spectrums although the Isaaq were the majority.

Somaliland

The Northern Peace Process 

After the SNM was able to exert control over North-Western Somalia, the organisation quickly opted for a cessation of hostilities and reconciliation with non-Isaaq communities. A peace conference occurred in Berbera between 15–21 February 1991 restore trust and confidence between Northern communities whereby the SNM leadership had talks with representatives from the Issa, Gadabursi, Dhulbahante and Warsangeli clans. This was especially the case since non-Isaaq communities were said to have been largely associated with Barre's regime and fought on opposing side of the Isaaq.

This conference laid the foundation for the "Grand Conference of the Northern Clans" which occurred in Burao between 27 April and 18 May 1991 which aimed to bring peace to Northern Somalia. After extensive consultations amongst clan representatives and the SNM leadership, it was agreed that Northern Somalia (formerly State of Somaliland) would revoke its voluntary union with the rest of Somalia to form the "Republic of Somaliland". Although there were hopes amongst of Northern communities for succession as early as 1961, the SNM did not have a clear policy on this matter from the onset. However, any nationalistic objectives amongst SNM members and supporters was abruptly altered in light of the genocide experienced under the Barre regime. As a result, strengthening the case for succession and reclamation of independence to the territory of State of Somaliland. Garad Cabdiqani Garaad Jama who led the Dhulbahante delegation was first to table the case for succession.

The Declaration of Independence 

In May 1991, the SNM announced the independence of "Somaliland" and the formation of an interim administration whereby Abdirahman Ahmed Ali Tuur was elected to govern for a period of two years. Many former SNM members were key in the formation of the government and constitution.

In May 1993 the "Borama Conference" took place to elect a new President and Vice President. The conference was attended by 150 elders from the Isaaq (88), Gadabursi (21), Dhulbahante (21), Warsengali (11) and Issa (9) communities and was endorsed by the SNM. As a result, the conference granted the government of Somaliland local legitimacy beyond the realms of the Isaaq dominated SNM, especially since the town of Borama was predominantly inhabited by the Gadabursi.

At this conference, the delegates agreed to establish an executive president and a bicameral legislature whereby Somaliland's second president Muhammad Haji Egal was elected. Egal would be reelected for a second term in 1997.

References

 
1980s in Somalia
History of Somaliland
Separatism in Somalia
Factions in the Somali Civil War